Vdovolsky is a rural locality (a khutor) in Kotovskoye Rural Settlement, Uryupinsky District, Volgograd Oblast, Russia. The population was 79 as of 2010. There are 2 streets.

Geography 
Vdovolsky is located 2 km east of Khopyor River, 19 km northwest of Uryupinsk (the district's administrative centre) by road. Skabelinsky is the nearest rural locality.

References 

Rural localities in Uryupinsky District